Nicholas Amoako (born December 6, 1997) is a Ghanaian football player. Who currently plays for Kalonji Pro-Profile

Career
Amoako signed with USL club Colorado Springs Switchbacks on 11 July 2018. He made his professional debut on 14 July 2018, appearing as a 62nd-minute substitute in a 1–0 loss to Sacramento Republic.

Personal
In 2011 Amoako came to the United States as a refugee from Mankessim in Ghana.

References

External links
Switchbacks bio

Nicholas Amoako in 2014
Ghanaian youngster Nicholas Amoako savours debut with American side Colorado Springs Switchbacks

1997 births
Living people
Ghanaian footballers
Ghanaian expatriate footballers
Colorado Springs Switchbacks FC players
Association football forwards
USL Championship players
Soccer players from Georgia (U.S. state)